Panki is a name of the following localities:

India
 Panki, Jharkhand
 Panki, Kanpur
 Panki Thermal Power Station

Poland
 Pańki, Gmina Choroszcz
 Pańki, Gmina Juchnowiec Kościelny
 Panki, Silesian Voivodeship

Russia
 Panki, a settlement and railway station (now in the Lyubertsy city)